Cristian Lucero may refer to:

 Cristian Lucero (footballer, born 1987), Argentine forward
 Cristian Lucero (footballer, born 1988), Argentine forward